Dejan Judež (born 2 August 1990 in Zagorje ob Savi) is a Slovenian ski jumper.

Judež became a national champion of Slovenia in 2011. On 18 March 2011 he made his first appearance in World Cup and also won his first points for 25th place.

External links

Slovenian male ski jumpers
Living people
1990 births
People from Zagorje ob Savi
21st-century Slovenian people